Hiawatha National Forest is a  National Forest in the Upper Peninsula of the state of Michigan in the United States. Commercial logging is conducted in some areas. The United States Forest Service administers this National Forest; it is physically divided into two subunits, commonly called the Eastside  and Westside .

Etymology
According to the forest service, it was "named after the Mohawk chief, Hiawatha, who brought about the confederation known as the Five Nations of the Iroquois. He was also the hero of Longfellow's poem, 'Hiawatha'."

Geography
In descending order of land area it lies in parts of Chippewa, Delta, Mackinac, Alger, Schoolcraft, and Marquette counties. Chippewa and Mackinac counties are in the East Unit, whereas the rest are in the West Unit. The smaller East Unit contains about 44% of the forest's area, whereas the larger West Unit has about 56%. Forest headquarters are located in Gladstone, Michigan. East Unit ranger district offices are located in Sault Ste. Marie and St. Ignace, while West Unit offices are in Manistique, Munising, and Rapid River.

The East Unit was a large infertile sandy area that was never homesteaded or developed. It was designated Marquette National Forest by President Theodore Roosevelt in 1909. This land was administered with  Huron National Forest as the Michigan National Forest from 1918 until 1962, when it was transferred to Hiawatha. The government began purchasing land for the West Unit in 1928, this land and was designated Hiawatha National Forest in 1931. This unit was extensively replanted by the Civilian Conservation Corps.

The Hiawatha National Forest contains six designated wilderness areas:
Big Island Lake Wilderness
Delirium Wilderness
Horseshoe Bay Wilderness
Mackinac Wilderness
Rock River Canyon Wilderness
Round Island Wilderness

There are five National Wild and Scenic Rivers in the Forest: Carp River, Indian River, Sturgeon River, Tahquamenon River (East Branch), Whitefish River.

Ecology

Many wildlife species roam in this forest including timber wolves, white-tailed deer, golden eagles, black bears, moose, coyotes, bobcats, bald eagles, beavers, red foxes, river otters, Canadian lynxes, hawks, muskrats, weasels, sandhill cranes, minks, Cougars, and wild turkeys.

Both units have shoreline on both Lake Superior and Lake Michigan; the east unit also has shoreline on Lake Huron and includes Round Island and its lighthouse. The West Unit borders Pictured Rocks National Lakeshore, which is administered by the National Park Service, and the Grand Island National Recreation Area, which is separately administered by the U.S. Forest Service.

Activities
Several lighthouses are located along the shores. The Point Iroquois Light is operated as a museum.

Hiking
A section of the  North Country Trail passes through the forest.

Camping
Hiawatha National Forest has many popular areas for camping tourism.  Some of the campgrounds include the following:

 AuTrain
 Bay Furnace
 Bay View, a 24-campsite campground located near Brimley on Lake Superior. It offers a secluded beach that many visitors enjoy.
 Brevoort Lake
 Camp 7 Lake
 Carp River, 44 campsites located near the Mackinac Bridge; fishing is possible here.
 Collwell Lake
 Corner Lake
 Flowing Well
 Indian River
 Island Lake
 Lake Michigan: 35 campsites on Lake Michigan located near the Mackinaw Bridge
 Little Bass Lake
 Little Bay De Noc
 Monocle Lake Campground, a 39-site campground located near Brimley near Lake Superior; it is a popular destination for RV camping.
 Petes Lake Campground
 Soldiers Lake Recreation Area
 Three Lakes Campground
 Widewaters Campground

References

External links

Hiawatha National Forest
Hiawatha National Forest Facebook

 
Landmarks in Michigan
National Forests of Michigan
Civilian Conservation Corps in Michigan
Protected areas established in 1931
Protected areas of Chippewa County, Michigan
Protected areas of Delta County, Michigan
Protected areas of Mackinac County, Michigan
Protected areas of Alger County, Michigan
Protected areas of Schoolcraft County, Michigan
Protected areas of Marquette County, Michigan
1931 establishments in Michigan